Maten al-Sahel, also known as Maten Arnouk, is a village in Tartus Governorate, northwestern Syria

Originally named for the prominent Arnouk family land owners, the Syrian government renamed the village Maten al-Sahel, "Coast". This village is located 280 km north-west of Damascus, near the Mediterranean coast. According to the Syria Central Bureau of Statistics, Maten al-Sahel had a population of 2,101 in the 2004 census. The majority of the population are members of the Eastern Orthodox Christian community, with an  Alawite Muslim minority.

Geography
Maten al-Sahel is situated on the top of mountain about 300 m above the level of the sea and looks down upon the coastal lands from the western side of the town with a wonderful view. The distance from the Tartus-Lattakia highway is 4 km and it is a sort of difficult mountainous road between olive tree fields. The village is surrounded by green valleys, and there are many roads across these valleys and mountains that are suitable for sport activities such as walking and cycling especially in the spring.

Prices
Taxi's fee from Damascus Airport to the Bus Station: $15
Bus Ticket from Damascus to Tartus (300 km, 3hours) by Al-Kadmous Company: $3
Car from Tartus to Almaten: $3
Private mini-bus directly from Damascus Airport to Maten al-Sahel (with town's private cars): $60
Private mini-bus for a daily trip: from $65

Demographics and services
The area around al-Maten is known to have been settled since the 18th century. Total population of al-Maten is about 3,500. The educational level in al-Maten is extremely high as the percentage of the illiteracy among the new generation is almost 0%, and the most of population are holding high degrees. al-Maten has all the requirements of modern life such as electrical networks, phones, mobile coverage, health center, and a developing transport system including two buses and many private cars and mini-buses.

Economy
The main industries in al-Maten are: agriculture, government, and immigration. Agriculture is the traditional job in al-Maten. More than 90% of the population depends on it as the main source of income.  Tomatoes in green houses and olive oil are the most important crops produced in al-Maten.

Climate
The climate is temperate and Mediterranean with hot, dry summers (maximum temperature 36 °C) and cool, variably rainy winters (minimum temperature 0 °C).

References

External links
Al-Maten Official Site

Populated places in Latakia District